

Summary 
Watts, Griffis and McOuat Limited ("WGM") is one of Canada's longest running independent firms of geological and mining consultants. Headquartered in Toronto, Ontario, Canada, the firm provides professional services to the global mineral resource industry, including exploration project management, property valuations, Mineral Resource and Reserve estimates, National Instrument 43-101 and JORC technical reports, and due diligence reviews.

History 
Established in 1962, the firm was co-founded by Murray Edmund Watts, Arthur Thomas Griffis, and Jack McOuat, each of whom has been inducted into the Canadian Mining Hall of Fame. WGM was a founding member of OMESE, the predecessor of CAMESE (Canadian Association of Mining Equipment and Services for Export).

Locations

Toronto 
8 King Street East, Suite 301, Toronto, Ontario, M5C 1B5

Beijing 
Unit 1107, Full Tower, 9 Dongshuan Zhong Lu, Chaoyang District, Beijing, P.R. China, 100020

Affiliations 
 Canadian Institute of Mining, Metallurgy and Petroleum (CIM)
 Prospectors and Developers Association of Canada (PDAC)
 Canadian Association of Mining Equipment and Services for Export (CAMESE)
 Association of Consulting Engineers of Canada (ACEC)
 Consulting Engineers of Ontario
 Association for Mineral Exploration British Columbia (AMEBC)
 China Mining Association
 Association of Professional Geoscientists of Ontario (APGO)
 Professional Engineers Ontario (PEO)
 Canadian Aboriginal Minerals Association (CAMA)
 United Nations Global Compact

See also
 Canadian Mining Hall of Fame
 Prospectors and Developers Association of Canada

References 

Mining companies of Canada